Franck Chantalou (born 22 June 1980 in Saint Denis, France)  is a French karateka who won a gold medal in the men's kumite +80 kg weight class at the 2004 European Karate Championships.

References

French male karateka
1980 births
Living people
Sportspeople from Saint-Denis, Seine-Saint-Denis